Sitthixay Sacpraseuth (born 15 March 1959) is a former Laotian sprinter who competed in the men's 100m competition at the 1992 Summer Olympics. He recorded a 12.02, not enough to qualify for the next round past the heats. His personal best is 11.37, set in 1982. In the 1980 Summer Olympics, he ran in the 200m, timed at 24.28.

References

External links
 

1959 births
Living people
Laotian male sprinters
Athletes (track and field) at the 1980 Summer Olympics
Athletes (track and field) at the 1992 Summer Olympics
Olympic athletes of Laos